Galactic Empires is a science fiction collectible card game that was published by Companion Games in 1994 until the company's bankruptcy in 1997.

Publication history
Following the success of the first collectible card game (CCG), Wizards of the Coast's Magic: The Gathering in 1993, Galactic Empires by Companion Games was one of the "first wave" of CCGs that followed. The first cards, which can be difficult to find, were designed by Carl Schulte, with writing by Schulte and John Hammer, and art direction by Richard Rausch and Edward Beard Jr., and were released in August 1994. These cards were all reprinted in Series II Primary Edition released in December 1994, which consisted of 421 cards sold in 55-card starter decks and 12-card booster packs.

Companion Games filed for Chapter 11 bankruptcy in early 1996 and continued to release products during its reorganization. Numerous expansion sets and a revised core set (Series U Universe Edition) were released over the following two years; this ended abruptly when the company filed for Chapter 7 bankruptcy in May 1997. Designer Carl Schulte had expressed hope that Component Game Systems would purchase Companion Games and continue the game, but this did not happen.

Of the 3208 cards that were printed, several hundred were promotional cards, some of which are difficult to obtain today. By the time of the game's demise, at least 40 different empires (and 16 distinct "tribes" of one empire, the Indirigan Nomads) had been printed in varying numbers and levels of playability.

Sets and expansions
Sets and expansions were in English. A German version of Series II Primary Edition was released at about the same time as its English-language counterpart, but with fewer cards.

The set sizes in the table below have been compiled from checklists on the Internet and may be inaccurate.  Many of the sets contain cards that are identical except for artwork and/or flavour text; for most sets these have been counted as separate cards. An exception was made for Series VIII, which has 100 distinct cards, among which 23 have 4 versions, 1 has 3 versions, and 1 has 2 versions, all but one of which have the same artwork and slightly different flavour text; so the die-hard collector would count 172 different cards. Some sets have cards for empires other than those listed, but not enough such to play these empires from that set alone.

The expansion set Realm of the Ancients and was planned for release in July 1997 to be sold in 5-card booster packs, and the second comedy set, Comedy Club Part 4 was planned for release in August 1997 to be sold in 100-card fixed starter decks.

Game play
As with all collectible card games, each player first purchases or obtains a basic deck of 55 cards, and then may supplement this by substituting cards from 15-card booster decks that contain a random assemblage of less powerful common cards and more powerful rare cards. When finished, the player's deck may still only contain 55 cards.

At the start of the game, each player is the leader of a sector of a galactic empire. The object of the game is to defend one's Sector HQ while destroying the other players' Sector HQs.

There are a variety of card types, the principal ones being resource-providing terrain (such as planets and moons) and resource-consuming ships, which can deal damage to opposing ships, terrain, and Sector HQs (and a variety of other card types). Each empire has its own unique trait, usually a weapon; there are also several "shipless" empires, for instance the Space Dragons and the Time Knights, that damage and defend using other means.

Each player draws nine random cards from their deck, laying down as much Terrain as they can. This generates Economy, Supply, Energy, Ammunition, Research, and Repair points, which are required to power units and various actions. Players can use Reaction cards at any time to interrupt the other player's actions. If a player succeeds in infiltrating the other player's defenses,
the player may assault the enemy Sector Headquarters. Whoever has the last intact Headquarters wins.

Reception
In the June 1995 edition of Dragon (Issue 218), Rick Swan was impressed  by the sheer number of cards, commenting that "the stylish cards [...] are less notable for their graphics than for their staggering variety." He found that the rulebook "explains the mechanics in detail" but felt the "clunky writing" could have benefited from some editing. The one part of the game that Swan criticized was the "book-keeping", which use dice as markers to track many things during the game. As Swan noted, "We're talking a lot of dice here, and none come with the game." He concluded by giving the game an above-average rating of 5 out of 6, saying, "It's recommended only if (1) you're willing to put up with chunks of clunky writing, (2) you don't mind keeping track of all the points, and (3) you've got one or two bags of dice handy. With the freewheeling mythology and dizzying variety of options, you can easily lose yourself in Galactic Empries goofy pleasures — it's like diving into a swimming pool of jelly beans."

Reviews
Review in Shadis

Further reading
Preview in Scrye #4
Overview in Scrye #8

References

External links
  Galactic Empires rules
   Galactic Empires official forum
  Eric B. Smith's homepage

Card games introduced in 1994
Collectible card games
Space opera board games